Nunaksaluk Island is an island off the coast of Labrador in the North Atlantic Ocean. The island's indigenous name is translatable to "irrelevant country for habitation". In 1932 HMS Challenger anchored off the island during its surveying of Labrador.

References 

Islands of Newfoundland and Labrador